Krishna Institute of Medical Sciences is located in  Karad, Maharashtra, The green, eco-friendly campus is spread over 57 acres and is well connected by rail, road & air.

The University is accredited by NAAC 'A+' grade and has been conferred with ISO 9001 : 2015 certification. The constituent faculties of the University include Medical, Dental, Physiotherapy, Nursing, Pharmacy and Biotechnology offering undergraduate and postgraduate courses in the respective faculties. It also runs Ph.D. programs and Post Doctoral Fellowships in various subjects.

The medical college is about 35 years old and is recognized by the Medical Council of India, Medical Council of Malaysia and is listed in the WHO's World Directory of Medical Schools. MBBS and postgraduate degree/diploma courses in clinical and basic sciences in 17 disciplines are recognized by Medical Council of India. It also admits the international students from all over the globe for undergraduate courses.

It has state-of-the-art museums with large collection of specimens and models. The KIMS diagnostic laboratory has been accredited by National Accreditation Board for Testing and Calibration Laboratories (NABL). The Lead Referral Laboratory is the first of its kind in Maharashtra state, which was ranked the first amongst 40 such centres in India. The well equipped Molecular & Human Genetics Laboratory is a feather in the cap.

The teaching hospital KH&MRC (Krishna Hospital and Medical Research Centre) is recognised by National Accreditation Board for Hospitals & Healthcare Providers (NABH).

The teaching hospital is 1125 bedded multispecialty tertiary care hospital with facilities for Critical Care, Endoscopic Surgeries, Dialysis, Cardiology, Cardio-vascular-thoracic-surgery, Oncology, Urology, Neurosurgery, Plastic surgery, Oral and Maxillofacial Surgery and a recognized Renal Transplant Unit. It has fully equipped major operation theaters, minor theaters, labour rooms, blood bank accredited by NABH, radiodiagnosis and radiotherapy, computerized medical records, counseling services etc. There are separate intensive care units like Medical, Surgical, Coronary care, Pediatric, Neonatal (accredited by Neonatology Forum of India), Respiratory and Obstetrics. The neonatal ICU is recognized by Neonatology Forum of India. The radio-diagnosis department has facilities for MRI, color doppler, mammography, DSA etc. It also actively participates in national healthcare programs and various extensions and outreach community programs initiated by the institute.

The University has been ranked 5th amongst the cleanest higher Educational Institutions in the category of 'Technical Institutions - Universities (Residential)' in the year 2018. The University has also received certificate for 'Maintaining, Promoting and Encouraging the Culture of Swachhta in Higher Education Institutions in the country'.

Experienced faculty, secure and spacious hostels, a sports complex, various extra-curricular activities have succeeded in attracting the students from all over India and from USA, UK, New Zealand, Middle East countries, Sri Lanka, Canada, Mauritius and many other countries.

Ranking

Krishna Institute of Medical Sciences was ranked 37th among medical colleges and 90th among Universities in India by the National Institutional Ranking Framework (NIRF) in 2020.

References

External links

Universities and colleges in Maharashtra
Educational institutions established in 1984
1984 establishments in Maharashtra
Medical colleges in Maharashtra
Affiliates of Maharashtra University of Health Sciences